Nuku-pewapewa  (fl. 1820–1834) was a New Zealand tribal leader. Of Māori descent, he identified with the Ngāti Kahungunu iwi. He was born in the Wairarapa, New Zealand, probably late in the eighteenth century. Te Aitu-o-te-rangi Jury was his niece, the daughter of his sister Aromea.

References

Year of birth unknown
1834 deaths
People from the Wairarapa
Ngāti Kahungunu people